The House of Representatives was an 80-seat body in the Tricameral Parliament of South Africa which existed from 1984-1994. It was reserved for Coloured South Africans. The body was elected twice; in 1984 and 1989. Electoral turnouts for the House of Representatives were poor.

The House of Representatives met in the former Senate chamber in  the Houses of Parliament, Cape Town.  The executive arm of the House of Representatives was a Ministers' Council, led by a Chairman. The civil service that dealt with Coloured "own affairs" (including education, health and welfare, local government, housing and agriculture) was called the Administration: House of Representatives, and was based in Cape Town.

Results
In 1984, the House was dominated by the Labour Party, which won 76 of the 80 seats.

In 1989, the Labour Party lost support but still maintained a majority of seats with 69. Other parties represented included the Democratic Reform Party, United Democratic Party, Freedom Party and 2 independents. The 1989 house was almost entirely dominated by men, with only 1 female elected.

Chairman of the Ministers' Council 
Helenard "Allan" Hendrickse (September 1984 -  3 February 1992)
Jakobus "Jac" A. Rabie (3 February 1992 - March 1994)

References

Defunct national legislatures
Defunct organisations based in South Africa
Apartheid government
Organisations associated with apartheid
1984 establishments in South Africa
1994 disestablishments in South Africa
Coloured South African people